The 2011 Appalachian State Mountaineers football team represented Appalachian State University in the 2011 NCAA Division I FCS football season. The Mountaineers were led by 23rd year head coach Jerry Moore and played their home games at Kidd Brewer Stadium. They are a member of the Southern Conference. They finished the season 8–4, 6–2 in SoCon play to finish in a tie for second place. They received an at-large bid into the FCS playoffs where they lost in the second round to Maine.

Schedule

References

Appalachian State
Appalachian State Mountaineers football seasons
Appalachian State
Appalachian State Mountaineers football